Skills Development Fund Corporation commonly known by the acronym PTPK is a Malaysian Statutory Body under the Ministry of Human Resources. It is responsible for providing financial assistance in the form of loans to individuals such as school leavers, graduates and others who are interested in pursuing Malaysian Skills Certification (SKM), Malaysian Skills Diploma (DKM) and Malaysian Advanced Skills Diploma (DLKM) at Public or Private Skills Training Providers accredited by DSD.

Vision
To become the main financier of the country's skills training.

Mission
To prepare and manage ongoing skills training funds effectively and efficiently

Objective
To provide sufficient annual funding to finance skills training and collecting repayment based on schedule.

References

http://www.skillsmalaysia.gov.my/fund/perbadanan-tabung-pembangunan-kemahiran/

External links
 Official website of the PTPK

Human Resources
Ministry of Human Resources (Malaysia)